Good Job, Good Job is a 2009 South Korean television series starring Chae Rim, Um Ki-joon, Kim Seung-soo, Kim Jung-hwa, Choi Daniel and Seo Hyo-rim. It aired on MBC from March 14 to August 2, 2009 on Saturdays and Sundays at 19:55 for 40 episodes.

Plot
Lee Kang-joo is a ceramics technologist and single mother. Her ex-boyfriend Yoo Ho-nam hadn't known that she was pregnant when he left her to study abroad. Now a psychologist, he returns to Korea, but Kang-joo hides the fact that he's the father of her daughter, Byul. Meanwhile, Choi Seung-hyun is a fitness club owner and the son of Kang-joo's mentor and boss. He has loved Kang-joo since high school, but not wanting to lose their friendship, she's remained unresponsive to his romantic overtures.

Cast

Main characters
 Chae Rim as Lee Kang-joo
 Um Ki-joon as Choi Seung-hyun
 Kim Seung-soo as Yoo Ho-nam
 Kim Jung-hwa as Na Mi-ra
 Choi Daniel as Lee Eun-hyuk
 Seo Hyo-rim as Ha Eun-bi

Supporting characters
 Kim Hae-sook as Wang Young-soon
 Joo Hyun as Lee Jung-jae
 Lee Han-wi as Mr. Min
 Jung Ae-ri as Jung Soo-hee
 Kang Boo-ja as Yoon Ok-rae
 Chun Ho-jin as Han Sung-hoon
 Yoon So-jung as Bae Jung-ja
 Jeon Min-seo as Lee Byul
 Kim Joo-hyuk as Lee Ho
 Won Jong-rye as Ho-nam's mother
 Kim Sun-hyuk as Yoo Ho-joon
 Ha Sung-chul as Coach Jang
 Lee El as Min-joo
 Park Ha-young as Na-yoon
 Lee Hyung-suk
 Han Young-kwang
 Go Da-mi
 Shin Young-jin
 Kang Min-hee

Awards
2009 MBC Drama Awards
Golden Acting Award, Veteran Actress: Jung Ae-ri
Best Young Actress: Jeon Min-seo

References

External links
 Good Job, Good Job official MBC website 
 

MBC TV television dramas
2009 South Korean television series debuts
2009 South Korean television series endings
Korean-language television shows
South Korean romance television series